The 2013 P&G U.S. National Gymnastics Championships was the 50th edition of the U.S. National Gymnastics Championships. The competition was held from August 15–18, 2013 at the XL Center in Hartford, Connecticut.

Event information 
The fiftieth edition of the Championships, the competition was held at the XL Center in Hartford, Connecticut, a multi-purpose arena and convention center located in downtown Hartford, Connecticut.  The XL Center is home to the University of Connecticut Men's & Women's Basketball teams along with the Hartford Wolf Pack, the American Hockey League affiliate of the New York Rangers.  The competition was televised by NBC Sports Network.

Competition schedule 
The competition featured Senior and Junior competitions for both women's and men's disciplines. The competition was as follows;

Thursday, August 15

1:00 pm – Jr. Women's Competition – Day 1
7:30 pm – Sr. Women's Competition – Day 1

Friday, August 16

1:00 pm – Jr. Men's Competition – Day 1
7:00 pm – Sr. Men's Competition – Day 1

Saturday, August 17

2:00 pm – Jr. Women's Competition – Final Day
7:30 pm – Sr. Women's Competition – Final Day

Sunday, August 18

11:30 am – Sr. Men's Competition – Final Day
6:30 pm – Jr. Men's Competition – Final Day

Note: all times are in Eastern Time Zone.

Sponsorship 
Procter & Gamble, a multinational consumer goods company, was the title sponsor of the event; as part of the a deal the company signed with USA Gymnastics from 2013–16.

Medalists

National Team
The following seniors were named to the National Team – Kennedy Baker, Simone Biles, Brenna Dowell, Peyton Ernst, Madison Kocian, McKayla Maroney, Maggie Nichols, Elizabeth Price, Lexie Priessman, Kyla Ross, MyKayla Skinner.  The following juniors were named to the National Team – Alyssa Baumann, Nia Dennis, Norah Flatley, Lauren Hernandez, Veronica Hults, Amelia Hundley, Bailie Key, Polina Shchennikova.

Participants 
The following individuals are participating in competition:

Senior

 MyKayla Skinner
 Erin Macadaeg
 McKayla Maroney
 Kyla Ross
 Madison Desch
 Maggie Nichols
 Lexie Priessman
 Elizabeth Price
 Kennedy Baker
 Simone Biles
 Peyton Ernst
 Ariana Guerra
 Madison Kocian
 Abigail Milliet
 Brenna Dowell

Junior

 Abby Paulson
 Alexandra Marks
 Alexis Vasquez
 Alyssa Baumann
 Amelia Hundley
 Ariana Agrapides
 Ashley Foss
 Ashton Locklear
 Bailie Key
 Bridget Dean
 Christina Desiderio
 Deanne Soza
 Emily Gaskins
 Emily Schild
 Felicia Hano
 Grace Quinn
 Grace Waguespack
 Jordan Chiles
 Lauren Farley
 Lauren Navarro
 Laurie Hernandez
 Lexy Ramler
 Megan Skaggs
 Melissa Reinstadtler
 Molly Frack
 Nadia Cho
 Nia Dennis
 Norah Flatley
 Polina Shchennikova
 Ragan Smith
 Samantha Ogden
 Sydney Johnson-Scharpf
 Vanasia Bradley
 Veronica Hults

References 

2013
National Championships,2013
2013 in gymnastics
Gymnastics,National Championships